Koninklijke Football Club Diest is a Belgian association football club from the town of Diest, Flemish Brabant.  It played two spells in the first division:  from 1961–62 to 1964–65 and from 1970–71 to 1974–75, finishing 7th in 1964.

History
The club was founded in 1909 as Hooger Op Diest Football Club and registered to the Belgian Football Association the same year to receive the matricule n°41, playing in black and white. In 1948 it merged with Standaard Athletiek Diest (matricule n°231) to become F.C. Diest. Seven years later it added Koninklijke (meaning royal) to its name to become K.F.C. Diest.

The club first reached the second division in 1957. It won this competition in 1961 and subsequently played at the highest level for the following years. In 1965 it was back at the second level and it won the competition again in 1970. In 1987–88 it played in the third division but returned to the second division due to a merger with F.C. Assent (at that time in second division) to become K. Tesamen Hogerop Diest, known as KTH Diest, now adding red to its colours. The club gradually dropped levels again, to the third division in 1996, fourth division in 2002 and into the Belgian Provincial Leagues in 2005. In 2006, with the club in last place at the 5th level and in severe financial difficulties, it went bankrupt and dropped two levels at once down to level seven. At that point the club changed its name back to K.F.C. Diest and reverted to the original colors of black and white. In 2009 the club promoted again, undefeated even, followed by another promotion in 2010 to again reach the highest level of provincial football. In 2016, the club promoted for the first time into the national leagues again, where it is currently residing in the Belgian Third Amateur Division (fifth level).

Notable players
René Carmans
Timmy Simons

References
 Belgian football clubs history
 RSSSF Archive – 1st and 2nd division final tables

Association football clubs established in 1909
Football clubs in Belgium
1909 establishments in Belgium
Organisations based in Belgium with royal patronage
K.F.C. Diest
Belgian Pro League clubs